Lamia, in ancient Greek mythology, was a child-eating monster and, in later tradition, was regarded as a type of night-haunting spirit (daemon).

In the earliest stories, Lamia was a beautiful queen of Ancient Libya who had an affair with Zeus. Upon learning this, Zeus's wife Hera robbed Lamia of her children, the offspring of her affair with Zeus, either by kidnapping or by killing them. The loss of her children drove Lamia insane, and in vengeance and despair, Lamia snatched up any children she could find and devoured them. Because of her cruel acts, her physical appearance changed to become ugly and monstrous. Zeus gave Lamia the power of prophecy and the ability to take out and reinsert her eyes, possibly because she was cursed by Hera with insomnia or because she could no longer close her eyes, so that she was forced to always obsess over her lost children.

The lamiai also became a type of phantom, synonymous with the empusai who seduced young men to satisfy their sexual appetite and fed on their flesh afterward. An account of Apollonius of Tyana's defeat of a lamia-seductress inspired the poem Lamia by John Keats.

Lamia has been ascribed serpentine qualities, which some commentators believe can be firmly traced to mythology from antiquity; they have found analogues in ancient texts that could be designated as lamiai (or lamiae) which are part-serpent beings. These include the half-woman, half-snake beasts of the "Libyan myth" told by Dio Chrysostom, and the monster sent to Argos by Apollo to avenge Psamathe (Crotopus).

In previous centuries, Lamia was used in Greece as a bogeyman to frighten children into obedience, similar to the way parents in Spain, Portugal and Latin America used the Coco.

Etymology
A scholiast to Aristophanes claimed that Lamia's name derived from her having a large throat or gullet (laimós). Modern scholarship reconstructs a Proto-Indo-European stem *, "nocturnal spirit", whence also comes lemures.

Classical mythology
In the myth, the Lamia was originally a beautiful woman beloved of Zeus, but Zeus's jealous wife Hera robbed her of her children, either by kidnapping and hiding them away, killing them, or causing Lamia herself to kill her own offspring. She became disfigured from the torment, transforming into a terrifying being who hunted and killed the children of others.

Diodorus Siculus ( 1st century BC) gave a de-mythologized account of Lamia as a queen of Libya who ordered her soldiers to snatch children from their mothers and kill them, and whose beauty gave way to bestial appearance due to her savageness. The queen, as related by Diodorus, was born in a cave. Heraclitus Paradoxographus (2nd century) also gave a rationalizing account.

Aristotle's Nicomachean Ethics (vii.5) refers to the lore of some beastly lifeform in the shape of a woman, which tears the bellies of pregnant mothers and devours their fetuses. An anonymous commentator on the passage states this is a reference to the Lamia, but muddlingly combines this with Aristotle's subsequent comments and describes her as a Scythian of the Pontus (Black Sea) area.

Lamia's eyes
According to one myth, Hera deprived Lamia of the ability to sleep, making her constantly grieve over the loss of her children, and Zeus provided relief by endowing her with removable eyes. He also gifted her with a shapeshifting ability in the process.

Diodorus's rationalization was that the Libyan queen in her drunken state was as if she could not see, allowing her citizens free rein for any conduct without supervision, giving rise to the folk myth that she places her eyes in a vessel. Heraclitus's euhemerized account explains that Hera, consort of Zeus, gouged the eyes out of the beautiful Lamia.

Genealogy
Lamia was the daughter born between King Belus of Egypt and Lybie, according to one source.

According to the same source, Lamia was taken by Zeus to Italy, and that Lamos, the city of the man-eating Laestrygonians, was named after her. A different authority remarks that Lamia was once queen of the Laestrygonians.

Aristophanes
Aristophanes wrote in two plays an identically worded list of foul-smelling objects which included the "Lamia's testicles", thus making Lamia's gender ambiguous. This was later incorporated into Edward Topsell's 17th-century envisioning of the lamia.

It is somewhat uncertain if this refers to the one Lamia or to "a Lamia" among many, as given in some translations of the two plays; a generic  is also supported by the definition as some sort of a "wild beast" in the Suda.

Hellenistic folklore

As children's bogey
The "Lamia" was a bogeyman or bugbear term, invoked by a mother or a nanny to frighten children into good behavior. Such practices are recorded by the 1st century Diodorus, and other sources in antiquity.

Numerous sources attest to the Lamia being a "child-devourer", one of them being Horace. Horace in Ars Poetica cautions against the overly fantastical: "[nor should a story] draw a live boy out of a Lamia's belly". Lamia was in some versions thus seen as swallowing children alive, and there may have existed some nurse's tale that told of a boy extracted alive out of a Lamia.

The Byzantine lexicon Suda (10th century) gave an entry for lamia (Λαμία), with definitions and sources much as already described. The lexicon also has an entry under mormo (Μορμώ) stating that Mormo and the equivalent mormolykeion are called lamia, and that all these refer to frightful beings.

"Lamia" has as synonyms "Mormo" and "Gello" according to the Scholia to Theocritus.

Other bogeys have been listed in conjunction with "Lamia", for instance, the Gorgo, the eyeless giant Ephialtes, a Mormolyce named by Strabo.

As a seductress
In later classical periods, around the 1st century A. D., the conception of this Lamia shifted to that of a sultry seductress who enticed young men and devoured them.

Apollonius of Tyana
A representative example is Philostratus's novelistic biography Life of Apollonius of Tyana.

It purports to give a full account of the capture of "Lamia of Corinth" by Apollonius, as the general populace referred to the legend. An apparition (phasma ) which in the assumed guise of a woman seduced one of Apollonius's young pupils.

Here, Lamia is the common vulgar term and empousa the proper term. For Apollonius in speech declares that the seductress is "one of the empousai, which most other people would call lamiai and mormolykeia". The use of the term lamia in this sense is however considered atypical by one commentator.

Regarding the seductress, Apollonius further warned, "you are warming a snake (ophis) on your bosom, and it is a snake that warms you". It has been suggested from this discourse that the creature was therefore "literally a snake". The empousa admits in the end to fattening up her victim (Menippus of Lycia) to be consumed, as she was in the habit of targeting young men for food "because their blood was fresh and pure". The last statement has led to the surmise that this lamia/empusa was a sort of blood-sucking vampiress.

Another aspect of her powers is that this empusa/lamia is able to create an illusion of a sumptuous mansion, with all the accoutrements and even servants. But once Apollonius reveals her false identity at the wedding, the illusion fails her and vanishes.

Lamia the courtesan
A longstanding joke makes a word play between Lamia the monster and Lamia of Athens, the notorious hetaira courtesan who captivated Demetrius Poliorcetes (d. 283 BC). The double-entendre sarcasm was uttered by Demetrius's father, among others. The same joke was used in theatrical Greek comedy, and generally. The word play is also seen as being employed in Horace's Odes, to banter Lucius Aelius Lamia the praetor.

Golden Ass
In Apuleius's The Golden Ass there appear the Thessalian "witches" Meroe and her sister Panthia, who are called lamiae in one instance.

Meroe has seduced a man named Socrates, but when he plots to escape, the two witches raid his bed, thrust a knife in the neck to tap the blood into a skin bag, eviscerate his heart, and stuff the hole back with sponge.

Some commentators, despite the absence of actual blood-sucking, find these witches to share "vampiric" qualities of the lamiae (lamiai) in Philostratus's narrative, thus offering it up for comparison.

Kindreds
Lamia's possible kindred kind appear in Classical works, but may be known by other names except for isolated instance which calls it a lamia. Or they may be simply unnamed or differently named. And those analogues that exhibit a serpentine form or nature have been especially noted.

Poine of Argos
One such possible lamia is the avenging monster sent by Apollo against the city of Argos and killed by Coroebus. It is referred to as Poine or Ker in classical sources, but later in the Medieval period, one source does call it a lamia (First Vatican Mythographer, c. 9th to 11th century).

The story surrounds the tragedy of the daughter of King Crotopus of Argos named Psamathe, whose child by Apollo dies and she is executed for suspected promiscuity. Apollo as punishment then sends the child-devouring monster to Argos.

In Statius' version, the monster had a woman's face and breasts, and a hissing snake protruding from the cleft of her rusty-colored forehead, and it would slide into children's bedrooms to snatch them. According to a scholiast to Ovid, it had a serpent's body carrying a human face.

In Pausanias's version, the monster is called Poinē, meaning "punishment" or "vengeance", but there is nothing about a snake on her forehead.

One evidence this may be a double of the Lamia comes from Plutarch, who equates the word empousa with poinē.

Libyan myth
A second example is a colony of man-eating monsters in Libya, described by Dio Chrysostom. These monsters had a woman's torso, the lower extremities of a snake, and beastly hands. The idea that these creatures were lamiai seems to originate with Alex Scobie (1977), and accepted by other commentators.

Middle Ages
By the Early Middle Ages, lamia (pl. lamiai or lamiae) was being glossed as a general term referring to a class of beings. Hesychius of Alexandria's lexicon ( 500 A.D.) glossed lamiai as apparations, or even fish. Isidore of Seville defined them as beings that snatched babies and ripped them apart.

The Vulgate used "lamia" in Isaiah xxxiv:14 to translate "Lilith" of the Hebrew Bible. Pope Gregory I (d. 604)'s exegesis on the Book of Job explains that the lamia represented either heresy or hypocrisy.

Christian writers also warned against the seductive potential of lamiae. In his 9th-century treatise on divorce, Hincmar, archbishop of Reims, listed lamiae among the supernatural dangers that threatened marriages, and identified them with geniciales feminae, female reproductive spirits.

Interpretations

This Lamia of Libya has her double in Lamia-Sybaris of the legend around Delphi, both indirectly associated with serpents. Strong parallel with the Medusa has also been noted. These, and other considerations have prompted modern commentators to suggest she is a dragoness.

Another double of the Libyan Lamia may be Lamia, daughter of Poseidon. Lamia by Zeus gave birth to a Sibyl according to Pausanias, and this would have to be the Libyan Lamia, yet there is a tradition that Lamia the daughter of Poseidon was the mother of a Sibyl. Either one could be Lamia the mother of Scylla mentioned in the Stesichorus (d. 555 BC) fragment, and other sources. Scylla is a creature depicted variously as anguipedal or serpent-bodied.

Identification as a serpent-woman
Diodorus Siculus ( 1st century BC), for instance, describes Lamia of Libya as having nothing more than a beastly appearance. Diodorus, Duris of Samos and other sources which comprise the sources for building an "archetypal" picture of Lamia do not designate her as a dragoness, or give her explicit serpentine descriptions.

In the 1st-century Life of Apollonius of Tyana the female empousa-lamia is also called "a snake", which may seem to the modern reader to be just a metaphorical expression, but which Daniel Ogden insists is a literal snake. Philostratus's tale was reworked by Keats in his poem Lamia, where it is made clear she bears the guise of a snake, which she wants to relinquish in return for human appearance.

Modern commentators have also tried to establish that she may have originally been a dragoness, by inference. Daniel Ogden argues that one of her possible reincarnations, the monster of Argos killed by Coroebus had a "scaly gait", indicating she must have had an anguipedal form in an early version of the story, although the Latin text in Statius merely reads inlabi (declension of labor) meaning "slides".

One of the doubles of Lamia of Libya is the Lamia-Sybaris, which is described only as a giant beast by Antoninus Liberalis (2nd century). It is noted that this character terrorized Delphi, just as the dragon Python had.

Close comparison is also made with the serpentine Medusa. Not only is Medusa identified with Libya, she also had dealings with the three Graeae who had the removable eye shared between them. In some versions, the removable eye belonged to the three Gorgons, Medusa and her sisters.

Hecate
Some commentators have also equated Lamia with Hecate. The basis of this identification is the variant maternities of scylla, sometimes ascribed to Lamia (as already mentioned), and sometimes to Hecate. The identification has also been built (using transitive logic) since each name is identified with empousa in different sources.

Stench of a lamia
A foul odor has been pointed out as a possible common motif or attribute of the lamiai. The examples are Aristophanes's reference to the "lamia's testicles", the scent of the monsters in the Libyan myth which allowed the humans to track down their lair, and the terrible stench of their urine that lingered in the clothing of Aristomenes, which they showered upon him after carving out his friend Sophocles's heart.

Mesopotamian connection
Lamia may originate from the Mesopotamian demoness Lamashtu.

Modern age

Renaissance writer Angelo Poliziano wrote Lamia (1492), a philosophical work whose title is a disparaging reference to his opponents who dabble in philosophy without competence. It alludes to Plutarch's use of the term in De curiositate, where the Greek writer suggests that the term Lamia is emblematic of meddlesome busybodies in society. Worded another way, Lamia was emblematic of the hypocrisy of such scholars.

From around the mid-15th century into the 16th century, the lamia came to be regarded exclusively as witches.

Bestiary
In Edward Topsell's History of Four-footed Beasts (1607), the lamia is described as having the upper body (i.e., the face and breasts) of a woman, but with goatlike hind quarters with large and filthy "stones" (testicles) that smell like sea-calves, on authority of Aristophanes. It is covered with scales all over.

Adaptations
John Keats's Lamia in his Lamia and Other Poems is a reworking of the tale in Apollonius's biography by Philostratus, described above. In Keats's version, the student Lycius replaces Menippus the Lycian. For the descriptions and nature of the Lamia, Keats drew from Burton's The Anatomy of Melancholy. August Enna wrote an opera called Lamia.

English composer Dorothy Howell composed a tone poem Lamia which was played repeatedly to great acclaim under its dedicatee Sir Henry Wood at the London Promenade concerts in the 1920s. It has been recorded more recently by Rumon Gamba conducting the BBC Philharmonic Orchestra for Chandos Records in a 2019 release of British tone poems.

The 1982 novel Lamia by Tristan Travis sees the mythological monster relocated to 1970s Chicago, where she takes bloody vengeance on sex offenders while the cops try to figure out the mystery.

Lamia, also known as Ramia, also appears as a boss in the Nintendo DS action role-playing game Deep Labyrinth.

Lamia is the main antagonist in the 2009 horror movie Drag Me to Hell voiced by Art Kimbro. In the movie, Lamia is described as "the most feared of all Demons" and having the head and hooves of a goat. A gypsy curse associated with him has Lamia torment the victim for three days before having its minions drag them into Hell to burn in its fires for all eternity.

Lamia appears as an antagonist in Rick Riordan's The Demigod Diaries, appearing in its fourth short story The Son of Magic. She is depicted as the daughter of Hecate and as having glowing green eyes with serpentine slits, shriveled-up hands with lizard-like claws on them, and crocodile-like teeth.

In the anime Monster Musume, the character Miia is a lamia.

Lamia are featured in the progressive rock album The Lamb Lies Down on Broadway by Genesis on the track "The Lamia." They are depicted as female creatures with 'snake-like' bodies and seduce the protagonist Rael in an attempt to devour him, but as soon as they 'taste' Rael's body, the blood that enters the lamias' body causes their death.

Raised by Wolves features a character named Lamia, an android mother, who has removable eyes and the ability to shapeshift.

Modern folk traditions

In modern Greek folk tradition, the Lamia has survived and retained many of her traditional attributes. John Cuthbert Lawson remarks "the chief characteristics of the Lamiae, apart from their thirst for blood, are their uncleanliness, their gluttony, and their stupidity". The contemporary Greek proverb, "της Λάμιας τα σαρώματα" ("the Lamia's sweeping"), epitomises slovenliness; and the common expression, "τό παιδί τό 'πνιξε η Λάμια" ("the child has been strangled by the Lamia"), explains the sudden death of young children.

Later traditions referred to many lamiae; these were folkloric monsters similar to vampires and succubi that seduced young men and then fed on their blood.

Fine arts

In a 1909 painting by Herbert James Draper, the Lamia who moodily watches the serpent on her forearm appears to represent a hetaera. Although the lower body of Draper's Lamia is human, he alludes to her serpentine history by draping a shed snakeskin about her waist. In Renaissance emblems, Lamia has the body of a serpent and the breasts and head of a woman, like the image of hypocrisy.

See also

 Abyzou
 Aswang
 Banshee
 Ceto
 La Llorona
 Lamashtu
 Lamia (Basque mythology)
 Lamnidae
 Melusine
 Moloch
 Nāga
 Undine
 Vrykolakas

Notes

References

Citations

Bibliography 

Kerényi, Karl (1951), The Gods of the Greeks pp 38–40. Edition currently in print is Thames & Hudson reissue, February 1980, .

 

Metamorphoses in Greek mythology
Children of Poseidon
Mortal women of Zeus
Queens in Greek mythology
Greek legendary creatures
Legendary serpents
Female legendary creatures
Monsters in Greek mythology
Mythological hematophages
Demons
Succubi
Libyan characters in Greek mythology
Bogeymen
Deeds of Hera
Daimons